This is a list of notable Singaporean Indians.

Academicians
 Kishore Mahbubani
 Shan Ratnam - professor and head of the department of Obstetrics and Gynaecology of the National University Hospital of Singapore

Actors, actresses and models
 Dalreena Poonam Gill - winner of Miss World Singapore (2014); Singapore football referee 
 Gurmit Singh - popular actor, host and comedy performer; best known for his role in Phua Chu Kang Pte Ltd
 Kumar - comedian, television host, actor, and drag queen
 Michelle Saram
 Nuraliza Osman - beauty queen who represented Singapore at the Miss Universe 2002
 Pilar Arlando - Miss Singapore World for 2009-2010
 Rathi Menon - model and beauty pageant titleholder who won the title of Miss Singapore Universe 2014

Arts and entertainment
 Haresh Sharma - Singaporean playwright
 Neila Sathyalingam - Singaporean classical Indian dancer
 T. Sasitharan

Businessmen
 G. Ramachandran
 Naraina Pillai - social entrepreneur and businessman; spent most of his life in Singapore during the colonial period; of Tamil origins, he greatly contributed to the Tamil community in Singapore
 Thomas Thomas

Criminals
 Gaiyathiri Murugayan, Singaporean maid abuser and killer who was serving 30 years in prison for abusing and killing her Myanmar maid.
 Julaiha Begum, wife of murdered ex-cop T Maniam who was executed in 2001 for instigating her husband's murder.
 Kalidass Sinnathamby Narayanasamy, a army lance corporal sentenced to death for molesting and killing his seven-year-old niece in 1977
 Mathavakannan Kalimuthu, Singaporean convicted murderer who was granted clemency by then President of Singapore Ong Teng Cheong and placed under life imprisonment.
Maniam Rathinswamy and S. S. Asokan, the two security guards responsible for killing a loan shark. Both were executed in 1995.
Nadarajah Govindasamy, a businessman executed in 1977 for killing the fiance of his daughter 
Surajsrikan Diwakar Mani Tripathi, a 20-year-old unemployed man who murdered a jogger at Punggol Field. He was found guilty of murder and sentenced to life imprisonment and fifteen strokes of the cane.
Shanmugam Murugesu, a drug trafficker and former sports athele who was executed in 2005
Somasundarajoo s/o Vengdasalam, Somasundram s/o Subramaniam and Ponapalam s/o Govindasamy, the three Indians who were among the eighteen rioters hanged for killing four prison officers during the Pulau Senang riots
Vasavan Sathiadew, who killed his foster brother for having an affair with Vasavan's wife

Doctors
 Balaji Sadasivan
 Gopal Baratham
 Kanwaljit Soin

Deejays and television personalities
 Anita Kapoor
 Sharanjit Leyl - reporter, producer and presenter with BBC World News
 Vanessa Fernandez

Lawyers
 Davinder Singh
 Eugene Thuraisingam - Human rights lawyer
 Glenn Knight - Singaporean lawyer and the first Director of the Commercial Affairs Department (CAD)
 Rajesh Sreenivasan
 Subhas Anandan - prominent criminal lawyer in Singapore

Legal authorities and diplomats
 Dileep Nair -  United Nations Under-Secretary-General for Internal Oversight Services; head of the United Nations Office of Internal Oversight Services
 Gopinath Pillai
 Kasinather Saunthararajah - Senior Counsel and former Judicial Commissioner of the Supreme Court of Singapore
 Ravinder Singh - Singaporean former army general
 Sundaresh Menon - Chief Justice of Singapore; former Attorney-General of Singapore; first ethnic Indian to hold both posts
 T. S. Sinnathuray - former Singaporean Supreme Court judge
 Vijaya Kumar Rajah - current Attorney-General of Singapore

Literary figures
 Chandran Nair - Singaporean poet and retired Director and Mediator of UNESCO
 Edwin Thumboo
 Janadas Devan - Singaporean journalist
 M. Balakrishnan - Singaporean author, popularly known by his pen name Ma Ilangkannan; first Tamil writer to receive the South East Asian Writers Award in 1982
 V. R. Gopala Pillai

Musicians
 Krissy - rapper and singer
 Lady Kash - award-winning international rapper and songwriter
 Paul Abisheganaden - conductor and Cultural Medallion recipient
 Priyadarshini - playback singer, researcher and performer whose works are predominantly in the Tamil, Kannada, Telugu and Hindi cinema industries.
 Shabir - award-winning singer-songwriter, record producer, music composer and performer whose works are predominantly in Tamil

Politicians

Opposition parties 

 J B Jeyeratnam
 Pritam Singh 
 Prof Paul Tambyah

Ruling party
 Devan Nair - 3rd President of Singapore
 Hri Kumar Nair
 Indranee Rajah
 K. Shanmugam - Minister for Foreign Affairs
 S. Dhanabalan
 S. Iswaran
 S. Jayakumar - previously served as Singapore's Senior Minister in the Cabinet and the Co-ordinating Minister for National Security from 2009 to 2011, Deputy Prime Minister from 2004 to 2009, Minister for Foreign Affairs from 1994 to 2004, Minister for Home Affairs from 1988 to 1994, Minister for Law from 1988 to 2008, and Minister for Labour from 1984 to 1985
 Tharman Shanmugaratnam - current Deputy Prime Minister of Singapore
 Vivian Balakrishnan - Minister for Environment and Water Resources

Religious
 Rennis Ponniah - 9th Bishop of Singapore
Balan

Rev Dr Edward Job - prominent philanthropist and religious leader

Sportspeople

Athletics
 C Kunalan
 Kesavan Soon

Cricket
 Mahadevan Sathasivam
 Stacey Muruthi

Football and soccer
 Anumanthan Kumar - Singapore international footballer
 Ram Shanker
 Rhysh Roshan Rai

Tennis
 Rheeya Doshi

Petanque
 Shanti Prakash Upadhayay

Others
 Satheesh Noel Gobidass, victim of an alleged murder case at Orchard Towers in 2019

See also

 List of Malaysians of Indian descent

References

Singaporean
Ethnic groups in Singapore
Indian diaspora in Singapore
Singaporean people of Indian descent
Indian